Norman "Nummy" W. Dieringer, surname more commonly spelled Derringer (February 4, 1914 – October 5, 1997), was a softball player and a baseball manager.

Career 
Born in Racine, Wisconsin, Derringer played on ten state championship softball teams from 1934 through 1946. A seven-time All-Star shortstop between 1934 and 1942, he was named Most Valuable Player in the 1934 ASA National Tournament while playing for the Ke-Nash-A's team.

As a member of Racine, Derringer helped his team to clinch the 1948 championship title of the National Fast Pitch League. He also was chosen All-Star shortstop of the league in 1948 and 1949.

Derringer joined the All-American Girls Professional Baseball League in 1950, scouting for the league and managing the Racine Belles in their final year of existence.

Legacy 
In 1986, Derringer was inducted in the Wisconsin ASA Hall of Fame. He is also part of Women in Baseball, a permanent display at the Baseball Hall of Fame and Museum at Cooperstown, New York. This exhibition was unveiled in 1988 to honor the entire AAGPBL rather than individual baseball personalities.

See also 

 USA Softball

Sources

 

All-American Girls Professional Baseball League managers
Male softball players
Sportspeople from Racine, Wisconsin
1914 births
1997 deaths